Kate Fleetwood (born 24 September 1972) is an English actress. She was nominated for a Tony Award for her performance as Lady Macbeth in Macbeth, which first opened at Chichester Festival Theatre and was transferred to the West End and Broadway, and for an Olivier Award for her performance as Julie in London Road at the National Theatre. She is patron of En Masse Theatre, and joint patron, with husband Rupert Goold, of Escape Arts' youth arts work.

Early life
Fleetwood grew up near Stratford-upon-Avon, and she is a graduate of Exeter University. She attended Trinity Catholic School in Leamington Spa. She began her career at the Royal Shakespeare Company during her childhood.

Personal life
She is married to Rupert Goold, who directed her in Macbeth; they have a son and a daughter.

Acting credits

Stage

Love Is the Drug (1995, Oxford Stage Company (OSC)) as Flamina
Twelfth Night (1996, OSC) as Viola
Swaggers (1996, Old Red Lion Theatre) as Nancy
The Comic Mysteries (1997, UK tour) as Death/Gabriel
Romeo and Juliet (1998, UK tour) as Juliet
Arabian Nights (1998, Young Vic) as Dinarzard/Parizade
Ghosts (1999, Theatre Royal Plymouth) as Regina
Nativity (1999, Young Vic)
The Two Noble Kinsmen (2000, Shakespeare's Globe) as the gaoler's daughter
The Tempest (2000, Shakespeare's Globe) as Iris
Tender (2001, Hampstead Theatre/ Birmingham Rep/ Theatre Royal Plymouth) as Tash
Medea (2001, (Queen's Theatre) as Chorus
Mariana Pineda  (2002, Gate Theatre) as Mariana Pineda
Love's Labour's Lost (2003, National Theatre) as Rosaline
A Midsummer Night's Dream (2003, Bristol Old Vic) as Helena
Othello (2003, Theatre Royal Northampton) as Desdemona
Hecuba (2004, Donmar Warehouse) as Polyxena
Pericles (2006, Royal Shakespeare Company (RSC)) as Thaisa
The Winter's Tale (2006, RSC) as Hermione
King Lear (2014, National Theatre) as Goneril
National Theatre Live: King Lear (2014) as Goneril
High Society (2015, The Old Vic) as Tracy Lord
Medea (2015, Almeida Theatre) as Medea
Ugly Lies the Bone (2017 National Theatre) as Jess
Absolute Hell (2018 National Theatre) as Christine
101 Dalmatians (2022, Regent's Park Open Air Theatre) as Cruella de Vil

Film

Television

References

External links 

1972 births
English child actresses
English stage actresses
English television actresses
Living people
Royal Shakespeare Company members
English Shakespearean actresses
20th-century English actresses
21st-century English actresses
People from Stratford-upon-Avon
Alumni of the University of Exeter
People from Cirencester